NMC Health is a healthcare chain and distribution business in the United Arab Emirates (UAE). The company is headquartered in Abu Dhabi and has branch offices in Dubai, Ajman, Al Ain and Northern Emirates. The company operates and manages over 200 facilities in 19 countries.

The company was accused in 2019 of understating debt on its balance sheet and later revealed that debt facilities of $2.7 billion had not been reported.

On 8 April 2020, NMC was placed into administration by a UK High Court judge Sebastian Prentis due to the insolvency of the company caused by alleged frauds committed by the founder and then-chairman of the board B. R. Shetty.

History
NMC Health was founded by B. R. Shetty in 1974 as the New Medical Centre in Abu Dhabi. In 1981, a new marketing & distribution division, NMC Trading was launched, which distributed medicines to pharmacies in the UAE. This division would later expand into distribution of fast-moving consumer goods, medical equipments and supplies and educational products.

From 1996, NMC began expanding to other emirates, setting up the NMC Clinic in Sharjah (1996), NMC Hospital, Deira, Dubai (1999), the NMC Specialty Hospital, Dubai (2004) and NMC Specialty Hospital in Al Ain (2008). In 2009, these hospitals were awarded the JCIA accreditation. In April 2012, NMC listed on the London Stock Exchange. That same year, NMC began managing operations at the Shiekh Khalifa General Hospital in Umm Al Quwain, acquired the BR Medical Suites in Dubai Healthcare City and continued their expansion with the addition of new medical setups such as NMC Royal Hospital in Khalifa City and operations in Al Ain's industrial area. In 2013, the company added a day-surgery centre in Mohammed Bin Zayed City in Abu Dhabi. NMC Health opened the NMC Hospital in Dubai Investments Park, NMC Brightpoint Royal Women's Hospital, and the NMC Medical Centre in Al Ain in 2014.

NMC Health acquired the Spain-based Clínica Eugin in 2015, allowing the company to become the leading integrated women's health provider from fertility through obstetrics and pediatrics in the UAE. That same year, the company also acquired UAE based medical groups, Dr. Sunny Healthcare Group (leading set of medical clinics in Sharjah and Northern Emirates), Provita and Americare Group, Abu Dhabi (focused on long-term care and rehabilitation) and acquired a 51% stake in Fakih IVF, another leading fertility clinic in UAE.

In August 2016, the company expanded its operations into Saudi Arabia when it acquired a 70 percent stake in As Salama Hospital in Al Khobar; NMC Health also invested in a project to build a 120-bed care centre in Jeddah that will be managed by its subsidiary Provita. In December 2016, NMC Health announced the acquisition of Al Zahra Hospital, one of the largest private hospitals in the UAE. In 2017 Emirates Healthcare, owned by Abu Dhabi investment group KBBO, announced the signing of an operating and management contract with NMC Health for the management of their Emirates Healthcare assets. NMC Health bought Aspen Healthcare for £10 million in August 2018.

Under-reporting of debt 
In December 2019, short-seller Muddy Waters questioned the company's statement of accounts, concerned that NMC had "manipulated its balance sheet to understate debt" and contained statements which were "hallmarks of significant fraud".

In February 2020, Executive Vice Chairman Khalifa Butti Omeir Bin Yousef resigned from NMC. The company said a legal review was being undertaken to verify the total interests of some of its shareholders over concerns they have been incorrectly reported. Later in the month shares in the company were suspended from trading amid concerns that debt had been under-reported: the Financial Conduct Authority announced an investigation.

Parallelly, in February 2020, as per the regulatory fillings to the London Stock Exchange, the company disclosed about the "highly preliminary approaches" made by the private equity groups Kohlberg Kravis Roberts and Switzerland-based GK Investment for possible buyout. However, Kohlberg Kravis Roberts backed off by 11 February 2020 and later GK Investment also backed off by the end of February.

In March 2020 the company reported that:
it has identified over $2.7 billion in facilities that had previously not been disclosed to or approved by the Board ... The Board believes that some proceeds may have been utilised for non-Group purposes.
This meant that the actual indebtedness was not $2.1 billion as previously reported but circa $5 billion as at 30 June 2019. On 24 March 2020 the total debt was then estimated at $6.6 billion. Many employees were not paid at that time.

On 8 April 2020, NMC went into administration in UK due to the insolvency of the company due to alleged frauds committed by founder and then-chairman of the board B.R. Shetty. Consequent to the request from the board of directors of NMC and on going investigation of potential financial irregularities, the company was suspended from its listing on the London Stock Exchange.

On 15 April 2020, Abu Dhabi Commercial Bank filed a criminal complaint against NMC Health with the Attorney General's Office of UAE.

In April 2021, HSBC and Standard Chartered cleared around $370M worth of positions in NMC's debt in two separate auctions as more information about likely restructuring recoveries become available.

Operations
NMC Health operates two business segments, healthcare distribution and services. The healthcare arm operates an international network of hospitals around the UAE and Europe. It is the largest private healthcare provider in the UAE and provides medical services including diagnostics, outpatient clinics, gynecology, obstetrics, human reproduction and pharmacy retail. In 2017, it operated more than 45 locations and more than 15 pharmacies, and employed over 1,200 doctors who saw more than 11,000 patients daily. NMC Health's distribution and services arm operates the subsidiary, NMC Trading, which engages in wholesale trading of pharmaceuticals, medical equipment, food and cosmetics. NMC Trading has distribution rights for companies such as, Nestlé, Pfizer, Siemens, Samsung, Sanofi and Henkel.

Recognition
NMC Health has been recognized as one of the UAE's strongest brands by the Superbrands Council since 2015. That same year, the company received the Frost & Sullivan Middle East Integrated Healthcare Company of the Year Award and a Sheikh Khalifa excellence award amongst others. The company was recognized for best practices in corporate social responsibility by the Dubai Chamber of Commerce and Industry in 2016. That same year, NMC Health received Stevie Awards in the Company of the Year in the Health Products and Services and Pharmaceuticals category and people's choice for favorite companies. In 2017, NMC Specialty Hospital and NMC Trading both received Mohammed bin Rashid Al Maktoum Business Excellence Awards. It has been selected by the Abu Dhabi National Oil Company (ADNOC) to manage operations of Ruwais Hospital in the Al Dhafra region.

References

External links
 Official website

2012 initial public offerings
Health care companies of the United Arab Emirates
Companies listed on the London Stock Exchange
Hospital networks
Emirati companies established in 1974
Health care companies established in 1974